The points classification in the Giro d'Italia is one of the secondary classifications in the Giro d'Italia. It is determined by points awarded for placings in the daily stages, regardless of time gaps. From 1967 to 1969 the leader wore a red jersey but in 1970 it was changed to mauve, and named the maglia ciclamino (from Italian: mauve jersey), the name of the colour in Italian being derived from the alpine flower the cyclamen. The red jersey was re-introduced in 2010, as the maglia rosso passione. However, in April 2017 RCS Sport, the organisers of the Giro, announced that the maglia ciclamino would be revived for the 2017 Giro d'Italia.

History

The first points classification in the Giro was used in 1958, called Trofeo A. Carli. The first rider in each stage was given 15 points, down to one point for the fifteenth rider. There was no jersey associated, and the next year it was not used again.

The ranking points system was reintroduced in 1966, when there was no associated jersey, while for the two subsequent editions a red jersey was awarded to the leader of the classification. From 1969 to 2009, the jersey was mauve, but often referred to as cyclamen.

Points are given to riders who finish among the first in a stage, independent of the time difference. There are also points given to the first cyclists to reach the intermediate sprints. There is an intermediate sprints competition, with names changing from year to year, (Intergiro, Expo Milano 2015, Traguardo Volante), which used to give a blue jersey to its leader.

Among the winners of the points classification are Mario Cipollini (three times), Alessandro Petacchi and in 2006 the future world champion Paolo Bettini.

At the other grand tours, the Tour de France and the Vuelta a España, there are also points classifications; the points classification in the Tour de France rewards a green jersey to its leader, as does the points classification in the Vuelta a España.

Current rules
From 2009 to 2013, the winner of each stage receives 25 points, independent of the type of stage (unlike the better known points classification in the Tour de France, where winning a mountain stage gives fewer points than winning flat stage). The next cyclist receives 20 points, the next ones 16, 14, 12, 10, 9, 8, 7, 6, 5, 4, 3, 2, until the fifteenth cyclist who receives one point.
Every stage (excluding time trials) also has an intermediate sprint. The first to cross that sprint receives 8 points, the next one 6 points, the next ones 4, 3, 2, until the sixth cyclist who receives one point.

In 2014 this was changed so that there are three levels of stages, each with its own point classification scheme. The first level, presumably the flat stages, will award points to 20 riders on a scale from 50 to 1 point. Level two stages will award points to the top 15 riders on a scale of 25 to 1 and level three stages will award points to the top 10 riders on a scale of 15 to 1 point. Points at intermediate sprints will follow a similar scale.

If two or more cyclists have the same number of points, the ranking is determined by the most stage victories, followed by the most intermediate sprint victories, followed by the lowest time in the general classification.

Winners

 The "Year" column refers to the year the competition was held, and wikilinks to the article about that season.
 The "Stages" column refers to the number of stages in the race, counting half stages as two and prologues as one.
 The "Stage wins" column refers to the number of stage wins the winner had during the race.
 The "Margin" column refers to the margin of time or points by which the winner defeated the runner-up.

Multiple winners
As of 2022, 10 cyclists have won the Points classification in the Giro d'Italia more than once.

By nationality
Riders from thirteen countries have won the Points classification in the Giro d'Italia.

Notes
The original winner was Alessandro Petacchi, who was stripped of his results from the 2007 Giro after a positive test for elevated levels of salbutamol.
Awarded after the disqualification (due to doping) of apparent winner Danilo Di Luca
Awarded after the disqualification (due to doping) of apparent winner Alberto Contador

Azzurri d'Italia classification
The Azzurri d'Italia classification (Azure or Sky Blue Italy) is an award in the Giro d'Italia in which points are awarded to the top three stage finishers (4, 2 and 1 point). It is similar to the standard points classification for which the leader and final winner are awarded the red jersey but no jersey is awarded for this classification, only a cash prize to the overall winner. For the 2007 Giro d'Italia, the Azzurri d'Italia winner won € 5,000.

Past winners

Note
The original winner was Alessandro Petacchi, who was stripped of his results from the 2007 Giro after a positive test for elevated levels of salbutamol.
Awarded after the disqualification (due to doping) of apparent winner Alberto Contador.

References

External links

Italian sports trophies and awards
Giro d'Italia
Cycling jerseys